Joseph Bowers (birth unknown – death unknown) was a professional rugby league footballer who played in the 1900s, 1910s and 1920s.

Bowers was selected to go on the 1920 Great Britain Lions tour of Australasia. He won a cap for Great Britain against New Zealand.

Bowers signed for Rochdale Hornets during October 1909, he made his début for Rochdale Hornets against Merthyr Tydfil RLFC.

Bowers was the landlord of The Fusiliers public house, Rochdale (now closed).

References

External links
!Great Britain Statistics at englandrl.co.uk (statistics currently missing due to not having appeared for both Great Britain, and England)

Great Britain national rugby league team players
Lancashire rugby league team players
Place of birth missing
Place of death missing
Rochdale Hornets players
Rugby league props
Year of birth missing
Year of death missing